is a passenger railway station in the city of Ryūgasaki, Ibaraki Prefecture, Japan operated by the private railway operator Kantō Railway.

Lines
Ryūgasaki Station is a terminus of the  Ryūgasaki Line, and is located 4.5 km from the opposing terminus of the line at Sanuki Station.

Station layout
The station consists of a single dead-headed side platform, with a rail yard to one side. The station was originally built with a bay platform, but the station was rebuilt after freight operations were discontinued in 1971, and the original platform and station building was replaced.

Adjacent stations

History
The line was merged with the Kashima Sangu Railway in 1944, which in turn became the Kanto Railway in 1965. The kanji of its name was changed to the present form in 1954.

Passenger statistics
In fiscal 2017, the station was used by an average of 2316 passengers daily (boarding passengers only).

Surrounding area
 Ryūgasaki City Hall
 Ryūgasaki Post Office
Ryutsu Keizai University

See also
 List of railway stations in Japan

References

External links

   Kantō Railway Station Information 

Railway stations in Ibaraki Prefecture
Railway stations in Japan opened in 1900
Ryūgasaki, Ibaraki